Chiu Hin Chun (born 20 August 1994) is a Hong Kong competitive rower.

He qualified to the 2016 Summer Olympics in Rio de Janeiro, and was selected to represent Hong Kong in the men's lightweight double sculls, together with Tang Chiu Mang.

References

External links 
 

1994 births
Living people
Hong Kong male rowers
Olympic rowers of Hong Kong
Rowers at the 2016 Summer Olympics
Rowers at the 2018 Asian Games
Asian Games medalists in rowing
Asian Games silver medalists for Hong Kong
Medalists at the 2018 Asian Games
21st-century Hong Kong people